"Of that Ilk" is a term used in the Scottish nobility to denote a clan chieftain in some Scottish clans. The term of that ilk means "of the same [name]", and is used to avoid repetition in a person's title.

Historically, it was customary in the Scottish feudal system for the laird of a manor to include the name of his fief in his title; Thus, in Robert Louis Stevenson's novel Kidnapped, the protagonist—after discovering he was the new laird of his (impoverished) manor—later introduced himself as "David Balfour, of Shaws". However, in a number of cases, the clan name was derived from the name of the fief, creating a repetition (such as, "Lord Anstruther of Anstruther", or even "Lachlan Maclachlan of Maclachlan"); for convenience, this was eliminated with the term of that Ilk (therefore, "Anstruther of that Ilk", or "MacLachlan of that Ilk").

Where a large clan of this type has one or more cadet branches, the leaders of those branches would have an estate name distinct from the clan name, leaving the term "of that Ilk" to denote the overall clan chieftain. Thus Mackenzie, in his Observ. Laws & Customs of Nations, refers to a decision of James VI "betwixt Blair of that ilk, and Blair of Balthaiock", two lairds of the now-defunct Clan Blair.

Clans
The following clans include the term "of that ilk" in the title of their clan chiefs

 Clan Blackadder
 Clan Buchanan
 Clan Cockburn 
 Clan Kilgour
 Clan Cranstoun
 Clan Dewar
 Clan Drummond
 Clan Forsyth
 Clan Hannay
 Clan Home
 Clan Innes
 Clan Kinninmont
 Clan Lamont
 Clan MacArthur
 Clan MacLachlan
 Clan Moffat
 Clan Moncreiffe
 Clan Nesbitt
 Clan Pollock
 Clan Pringle
 Clan Ralston
 Clan Rutherford
 Clan Swinton
 Clan Wallace
 Clan Wemyss

References

Honorifics
Scottish titles